Hipólita Graciela Rodríguez (born 13 August 1925 in Yoro) is a Honduran politician. She currently serves as deputy of the National Congress of Honduras representing the Democratic Unification Party for Yoro.

References

1925 births
Living people
People from Yoro Department
Deputies of the National Congress of Honduras
Democratic Unification Party politicians
21st-century Honduran women politicians
21st-century Honduran politicians